CBS Daytime is a division within CBS that is responsible for the daytime television block programming on the CBS' late morning and early afternoon schedule. The block has historically encompassed soap operas and game shows.

Schedule
NOTE: All times listed are in Eastern Time Zone.

Most CBS affiliates in the Central, Mountain, and Pacific time zones, and in Alaska and Hawaii air this schedule one hour earlier (starting at 9:00 am); local schedules may differ over all time zones.

CBS provides two separate feeds of Let's Make a Deal, at 10:00 am and 3:00 pm Eastern time (9:00 am and 2:00 pm Central time); affiliates who follow the network's master schedule have the option to air the program in either timeslot.
CBS provides an alternate feed of The Young and the Restless at 11:00 am Central time (12:00 pm Eastern); this feed is used by some stations outside of the Eastern Time Zone to accommodate their Noon hour local newscasts. CBS stations who utilize this option include network-owned WCCO-TV in Minneapolis, and affiliates KLAS-TV in Las Vegas, KMOV in St. Louis, and KIRO-TV in Seattle. 
Some CBS affiliates air The Bold and the Beautiful at different times other than 1:30/12:30 PM, (e.g. KIRO-TV in Seattle, which airs the show at 2:00 PM).

Current programs

Game shows

Let's Make a Deal
 Debut: October 5, 2009
 Replaced program: Guiding Light
 Taping location: Quixote Studios, Sylmar, California
 Host: Wayne Brady
 Announcer: Jonathan Mangum
 Production Company: Stefan Hatos-Monty Hall Productions in association with Fremantle/RTL Group
 Producing Team: John Quinn (executive producer)
 Directing/Writing Team: Lenn Goodside (director)

The Price Is Right
 Debut: September 4, 1972
 Replaced program: The Beverly Hillbillies
 Taping location: The Bob Barker Studio (Studio 33), Television City, Los Angeles, California
 Host: Drew Carey
 Announcer: George Gray
 Production Company: Fremantle/RTL Group
 Producing Team: Evelyn Warfel (executive producer), Adam Sandler (co-executive producer), Adam Sandler (producer), Stan Blits, Sue MacIntyre (co-producers), Vanessa Voss (prize producer), Gina Edwards Nyman (associate producer)
 Directing/Writing Team: Adam Sandler (director)

Soap operas

The Young and the Restless
 Debut: March 26, 1973
 Replaced program: Where the Heart Is
 Taping location: Television City, Los Angeles, California (Stage 41 and 43)
 Creators: William J. Bell, Lee Phillip Bell
 Production company: Bell Dramatic Serial Company and Corday Productions in association with Sony Pictures Television
 Producing team: Anthony Morina (Executive Producer), Matthew J. Olsen (Producer), Jonathan Fishman (Producer), Lisa de Cazotte (Supervising Producer), John Fisher (Supervising Producer)
 Directing team: Sally McDonald, Owen Renfroe, Michael Eilbaum, Dean LaMont
 Head writer: Josh Griffith
 Script Editor: Matt Clifford
 Associate head/breakdown/script writers: Sara A. Bibel, Beth Milstein, Natalie Minardi Slater, Jeff Beldner, Amanda L. Beall, Janice Ferri Esser, Susan Dansby, Michael Conforti, Christopher Dunn, Dave Rupel, Christian McLaughlin, Michael Montgomery
 Casting director: Sheila Guthrie
 Cast: Peter Bergman, Eric Braeden, Sharon Case, Sean Dominic, Melissa Claire Egan, Conner Floyd, Michael Graziadei, Camryn Grimes, Mark Grossman, Amelia Heinle, Courtney Hope, Bryton James, Christel Khalil, Allison Lanier, Christian LeBlanc, Kate Linder, Michael Mealor, Joshua Morrow, Melissa Ordway, Brytni Sarpy, Zuleyka Silver, Melody Thomas Scott, Trevor St. John, Michelle Stafford, Jason Thompson, Susan Walters

The Bold and the Beautiful
 Debut: March 23, 1987
 Replaced program: Capitol
 Taping location: Television City, Los Angeles, California (Stage 31)
 Creators: William J. Bell, Lee Phillip Bell
 Production company: Bell-Phillip Television Productions Inc.
 Producing team: Bradley Bell (Executive Producer), Edward Scott (Supervising Producer), Casey Kasprzyk (Supervising Producer), Cynthia J. Popp (Producer), Mark Pinciotti (Producer)
 Directing team: Michael Stich, Deveney Kelly, Cynthia J. Popp, David Shaughnessy, Jennifer Howard, Steven A. Wacker, Clyde Kaplan, Catherine Sedwick
 Head writer: Bradley Bell
 Co-Head Writers: Michael Minnis, Mark V. Pincotti
 Script writers: John F. Smith, Rex M. Best, Tracey Ann Kelly, Adam Dusevoir, Shannon B. Bradley, Patrick Mulcahey, Michele Val Jean
 Story consultant: Patrick Mulcahey, Lee Phillip Bell (Long Term Story Advisor)
 Casting Director: Christy Dooley
 Cast: Krista Allen, Matthew Atkinson, Kimberlin Brown, Darin Brooks, Scott Clifton, Delon de Metz, Don Diamont, Sean Kanan, Thorsten Kaye, Katherine Kelly Lang, John McCook, Annika Noelle, Tanner Novlan, Lawrence Saint-Victor, Heather Tom, Diamond White, Jacqueline MacInnes Wood

Talk show

The Talk
 Debut: October 18, 2010
 Replaced program: As the World Turns
 Taping location: CBS Studio Center, Studio City, Los Angeles
 Hosts: Sheryl Underwood, Amanda Kloots, Jerry O'Connell, Akbar Gbaja-Biamila and Natalie Morales (moderator)
 Production Company: CBS Studios
 Producing Team: John Redmann (executive producer), Sara Gilbert (executive producer)

Former shows on CBS Daytime

Soap operas
 As the World Turns (1956–2010)
 The Brighter Day (1954–1962)
 Capitol (1982–1987)
 The Clear Horizon (1960–1961; 1962)
 The Edge of Night (1956–1975; moved to ABC from 1975–1984)
 The Egg and I (1951–1952)
 The First Hundred Years (1950–1952)
 Full Circle (1960–1961)
 Guiding Light (1952–2009, on radio 1937–1956)
 Hotel Cosmopolitan (1957–1958)
 Love Is a Many Splendored Thing (1967–1973)
 Love of Life (1951–1980)
 Portia Faces Life (1954–1955)
 The Road of Life (1954–1955)
 Search for Tomorrow (1951–1982; moved to NBC from 1982–1986)
 The Secret Storm (1954–1974)
 The Seeking Heart (1954–1955)
 Valiant Lady (1953–1957)
 Where The Heart Is (1969–1973)
 Woman with a Past (1954)

Game shows
Despite little genre output when compared to NBC and ABC, CBS is the last remaining Big Three television networks to carry daytime game shows. While NBC and ABC were still producing several game shows in daytime, CBS gave up on the format during the 1967–68 season. From 1968 until March 1972, the network carried no game shows. However, as part of CBS's "rural purge" effort to lure wealthier suburban viewers, CBS executive Fred Silverman commissioned the game show Amateur's Guide to Love. Hosted by Gene Rayburn, the show ran from March 27 to June 23.

Despite the failure of Amateur's Guide, Silverman commissioned three other games for debut on September 4 – The New Price Is Right, Gambit, and The Joker's Wild – to replace the reruns seen in the daytime slots up to this point. All were major hits, and more games were added as time went on; Joker ended in 1975 and Gambit in 1976, but both have spawned revivals. The Price Is Right has aired continuously in daytime on CBS since its debut.

Currently, CBS carries two network games: The Price Is Right and a revival of Let's Make a Deal which debuted in 2009. Prior to Deal, the last game on CBS (other than Price) was the Ray Combs-hosted revival of Family Feud, which aired from 1988 to 1993.
 Missus Goes a Shopping (1947–1949; renamed This Is The Missus in November 1948)
 Beat the Clock (1950–1958, 1979–1980; renamed All-Star Beat the Clock in November 1979)
 Winner Take All (1951)
 Strike It Rich (1951–1958)
 Your Surprise Store (1952)
 Wheel of Fortune (1952–1953; not the same game show as the 1989–1991 version)
 Double or Nothing (1952–1954)
 There's One In Every Family (1952–1953)
 Freedom Rings (1953)
 I'll Buy That (1953–1954)
 The Big Payoff (1953–1959)
 On Your Account (1954–1956)
 Love Story (1955–1956)
 Dotto (1958)
 How Do You Rate? (1958)
 For Love or Money (1958–1959)
 Top Dollar (1958–1959; replaced Dotto)
 Play Your Hunch (1958–1959)
 Video Village (1960–1962)
 Your Surprise Package (1961–1962)
 Double Exposure (1961)
 Face the Facts (1961)
 Password (1961–1967; replaced Face the Facts; Million Dollar Password from 2008 to 2009)
 To Tell the Truth (1962–1968; currently airs in primetime on ABC)
 The Amateur's Guide to Love (1972)
 Gambit (1972–1976; later aired on NBC from 1980–1981)
 The Joker's Wild (1972–1975; later aired in syndication from 1977–1986; revived in primetime by TBS in 2017)
 Hollywood's Talking (1973)
 The $10,000 Pyramid (1973–1974; later aired on ABC from 1974–1981)
 Match Game '73-'79 (1973–1979; replaced Hollywood's Talking; currently airs in primetime on ABC as Match Game)
 Now You See It (1974–1975 and April–July 1989; replaced Card Sharks in 1989)
 Tattletales (1974–1978; 1982–1984)
 Spin-Off (1975; replaced The Joker's Wild)
 Musical Chairs (1975)
 Give-n-Take (1975; replaced Spin-Off)
 Double Dare (1976–1977; replaced Gambit)
 Pass the Buck (1978)
 Tic-Tac-Dough (Summer 1978; later aired in syndication from 1978–1986)
 Whew! (1979–1980; renamed Celebrity Whew! in November 1979)
 Child's Play (1982–1983, replaced by Press Your Luck)
 The $25,000 Pyramid (1982–1988; temporarily replaced by Blackout; currently airs in primetime on ABC as The $100,000 Pyramid)
 Press Your Luck (1983–1986; replaced Child's Play; revived in primetime by ABC in 2019)
 Body Language (1984–1986; replaced Tattletales)
 Card Sharks (1986–1989; replaced Body Language; revived in primetime by ABC in 2019)
 Blackout (1988; replaced and subsequently replaced by The $25,000 Pyramid, later replaced by Family Feud)
 Family Feud (1988–1993; replaced The $25,000 Pyramid and Blackout; renamed Family Feud Challenge and expanded to 60 minutes in June 1992; currently airs in syndication; primetime celebrity series aired on NBC in 2008 and on ABC from 2015-present)
 Wheel of Fortune (1989–1991; replaced Now You See It; currently airs in syndication)

Past proposed series
 1957: The Will to Dream by Doris Frankel about the relationship between an atomic scientist and his wife
 1964: Roy Winsor created The Widening Circle, a spinoff of The Secret Storm. A pilot was shot with James Vickery as Alan Dunbar and Diana Muldaur as Ann Wicker.
 1971: Fred J. Scollay created Absent Without Love.
 1972: Winifred Wolfe and Mary Harris had a proposal for a one-hour serial titled Yesterday's Child...Tomorrow's Adult
 1982: Beverly Hills, California
 1983: Grosse Pointe - set in Michigan; featured competing families in the auto industry and auto racers
 1985: series created by Johnathan Valin 
 1986: During her absence from Ryan's Hope, Michael Brockman, former President of CBS Daytime, asked Claire Labine to develop a new serial in 1986. Her proposal was entitled Celebration but never made it to the air.
 1986: The Billionaires by Barbara Bauer and Paul Rauch

Executives

As of 2019, CBS Daytime has been folded into the network's current programming division.

Notable profiles

Soderberg
Robert Soderberg is an American TV writer. He was born in Lakewood, Ohio and died in Santa Barbara, California in 1996.

In 1969, he co-wrote the teleplay for an unsold television pilot called Shadow Man about a man who has plastic surgery and assumes the identity of a multi-billionaire to do good for all humanity.

He has thirteen credits to his name, including being the Head Writer of CBS Daytime's As the World Turns (1973–1978) and Guiding Light and ABC Daytime’s One Life to Live and General Hospital (1989).

He has received three Daytime Emmy Awards.

Calhoun
Robert Calhoun is an American television writer, producer and director.

He graduated from the University of Maryland, College Park then went on to serve three years in the United States Navy. He was a gay man. 

His credits include Guiding Light (as Head Writer during the 1988 Writers Guild of America strike and Executive Producer from 1988 to 1991; replaced by Jill Farren Phelps), As the World Turns (EP: 1984–1988 replaced by Laurence Caso), Another World and Texas (1981).

He has garnered 8 Daytime Emmy Award nominations. His first nomination in 1979 was shared with Ira Cirker, Melvin Bernhardt, and Paul Lammers.

Frisch
Peter Frisch is an American TV and theatre producer and director.  

He received his M.F.A. in stage direction from Carnegie Mellon. As a nationally recognized teacher and coach, Peter has held faculty posts at Carnegie, The Juilliard School, Harvard University, Boston University, Cal Arts, and UCLA. He has taught and coached professional actors and directors in New York and Los Angeles over the last forty years.

Prior to coming to Santa Barbara, Frisch served as Producer on The Young and the Restless for CBS Daytime. He came to the show directly from Pittsburgh and a six-year stint as Head of Drama at Carnegie Mellon University's prestigious School of Drama where he also taught and directed for the mainstage. Moonlighting, he also directed seventeen events for the Pittsburgh Symphony Orchestra, working with musicians such as Mariss Jansons, Marvin Hamlisch and Rolando Villazon.

During the past 35 years, Peter has directed over 160 productions in the New York and regional theatre, including a full range of classic and contemporary plays, cabaret and opera. He has been Producing Director of the Hyde Park Festival Theatre (NY), Resident Director with the Berkshire Theatre Festival and Artistic Director of American Playwrights Theatre in Washington, D.C.

Peter received a Joseph Jefferson Award for the Chicago premiere of American Dreams (co-authored with Studs Terkel) and the Outer Circle Award for My Papa's Wine on New York's Theatre Row. At American Playwrights Theatre, his collaboration with Larry L. King led to a 1988 Helen Hayes Award for The Night Hank Williams Died. Also at APT, he won an inaugural John F. Kennedy Center for the Performing Arts/American Express Grant for his production of Speaking In Tongues, about controversial film director Pier Paolo Pasolini.

Previously in Los Angeles, Peter served as a Producer on Fox Broadcasting Company's Tribes.

Frisch has been a panelist for the National Endowment for the Arts and the Fulbright Program and served as a board member of the Society of Stage Directors and Choreographers Foundation. He is an enthusiastic amateur musician and has been published in a variety of journals from Sound & Vision to The Washington Report on Middle Eastern Affairs.

CBS Daytime slogans
 1981: "Powerful Dramas"
 1982: "DayDreams"
 1985–1986: "In the Heat of the Day"
 1986: "In the Heat of It" (summer slogan)
 1986–1987: "Rumor Has It"
 1987–1988: "Can't Get Enough"
 1988–1989: "Be Tempted"
 1989–1990: "Wilder Than Ever"
 1990–1991: "Anything can happen...On the Edge"
 1991–1992: "Try Me"
 1992–1993: "Imagine"
 1993–1994: "Don't Blink and Don't Look Away"
 1994–1995: "Every Moment"
 1995–1996: "Aren't You Glad Today"
 1996–1997: "Always Watch Your Back"
 1997: "Lose Your Cool" (summer slogan)
 1997–1999: "Oh, If You Only Knew"
 1999–2001: "What Happens Next...is Everything (It's Everything)"
 2001–2002: "Did You Understand That?"
 2002–2003: "Get it On"
 2003–2004: "Hot Enough for You"
 2004–2005: "The Look That's Got You Hooked"
 2005–2006: "Nobody Does it Better"
 2006–2007: "The Day Belongs to CBS"
 2007–2009: "The Drama is Always On"
 2009: "Summer is for CBS Daytime" (summer slogan)
 2009–2020: "Only CBS Daytime"
 2012: "CBS Daycation" (summer slogan)
 2014–2020: "So Good" (alternate)

TV ratings

Because of a quirk in The Price Is Right from 1975 during the experimental run at a one-hour format in September that became final that November, that show's ratings in daytime are split into first half and second half segments. The same has been done for the ratings for Let's Make a Deal since that show's premiere in 2009.

See also
 ABC Daytime
 NBC Daytime

References

External links
 Official website (from the Internet Archive Wayback Machine)

American television soap operas
CBS Television Network
Television programming blocks in the United States